Bocula xanthostola is a moth of the family Erebidae first described by George Hampson in 1926. It is found in Sri Lanka, Peninsular Malaysia, Sumatra and Borneo.

Description
Its wingspan is about 31 mm. The body is whitish with a slight pink tinge. Thorax blackish brown. Forewings with a black-brown fascia from base, becoming very broad in and beyond the end of cell. A white speck is found at the lower angle of the cell. Postmedial and marginal series of specks can be seen. Veins are rather pale in color. Hindwings are pinkish fuscous.

References

Rivulinae